Wincle is a civil parish in Cheshire East, England. It contains 25 buildings that are recorded in the National Heritage List for England as designated listed buildings.  Of these, one is listed at Grade II*, the middle of the three grades, and the others are at Grade II.  The parish is in the Peak District National Park.  It lies in the foothills of the Pennines and, apart from small settlements, is entirely rural.  Most of the listed buildings are farmhouses and farm buildings, or houses.  There are also six parish boundary stones that are listed.  The other listed buildings include bridges, a church, and a school with attached master's house.

Key

Buildings

See also

Listed buildings in Sutton, Cheshire East
Listed buildings in Macclesfield Forest and Wildboarclough
Listed buildings in Leekfrith
Listed buildings in Heaton, Staffordshire
Listed buildings in Bosley

References
Citations

Sources

 

 

Listed buildings in the Borough of Cheshire East
Lists of listed buildings in Cheshire